Vivien Noakes (née Langley; 16 February 1937 – 17 February 2011) was a British biographer, editor and critic, an expert on Edward Lear and the literature of the First World War. She was a fellow of the Royal Society of Literature.

Early life and education
She was born Vivien Mary Langley, daughter of noted aeronautical engineer Marcus Langley and educated at Dunottar School, leaving with A-levels. It was not until later in life that she took her degree at Manchester College, Oxford, and Somerville College, Oxford, where she was subsequently lecturer.

Career
She lectured at Harvard University and at the Yale Center for British Art. She was a leading authority- per her Times obituary, "the world's leading authority"- on Edward Lear and on the literature of World War I.

Personal life
She was married to the painter Michael Noakes, in collaboration with whom she produced The Daily Life of The Queen: An Artist's Diary (2000); the couple had three children: Anya, Jonathan and Benedict.

She died of cancer the day after her 74th birthday, a month after suffering a stroke. Noakes left copies of many of Lear's letters to Somerville College Library.

Works
Edward Lear, The Life of a Wanderer (1968).  (2006 ed.)
Edward Lear, 1812-1888 (1986). 
The Painter Edward Lear (1991). 
The Daily Life of The Queen: An Artist's Diary (2000) with Michael Noakes. 
Voices of Silence (2006).

Links
 Michael and Vivien Noakes' website; accessed 10 April 2014.

References

1937 births
2011 deaths
English biographers
English literary critics
Women literary critics
Alumni of Harris Manchester College, Oxford
Alumni of Somerville College, Oxford
Harvard University staff
Yale University staff
Deaths from cancer in England
Fellows of the Royal Society of Literature
People educated at Dunottar School for Girls